2017 United Kingdom budget may refer to:

March 2017 United Kingdom budget
November 2017 United Kingdom budget